Indigenous land rights are the rights of Indigenous peoples to land and natural resources therein, either individually or collectively, mostly in colonised countries. Land and resource-related rights are of fundamental importance to Indigenous peoples for a range of reasons, including: the religious significance of the land, self-determination, identity, and economic factors. Land is a major economic asset, and in some Indigenous societies, using natural resources of land and sea form the basis of their household economy, so the demand for ownership derives from the need to ensure their access to these resources. Land can also be an important instrument of inheritance or a symbol of social status. In many Indigenous societies, such as among the many Aboriginal Australian peoples, the land is an essential part of their spirituality and belief systems.

Indigenous land claims have been addressed with varying degrees of success on the national and international level since the very beginning of colonization. Such claims may be based upon the principles of international law, treaties, common law, or domestic constitutions or legislation.  Aboriginal title (also known as Indigenous title, native title and other terms) is a common law doctrine that the land rights of indigenous peoples to customary tenure persist after the assumption of sovereignty under settler colonialism. Statutory recognition and protection of Indigenous and community land rights continues to be a major challenge, with the gap between formally recognized and customarily held and managed land is a significant source of underdevelopment, conflict, and environmental degradation.

International law

The foundational documents for Indigenous land rights in international law include the Indigenous and Tribal Peoples Convention, 1989 ("ILO 169"), the United Nations Declaration on the Rights of Indigenous Peoples, the Convention on the Elimination of All Forms of Racial Discrimination, the International Covenant on Civil and Political Rights, the American Convention on Human Rights, and the American Declaration on the Rights of Indigenous Peoples.

China

Arab Region

Common law

Aboriginal title, also known as native title (Australia), customary title (New Zealand), original Indian title (US), is the common law doctrine that the land rights of indigenous peoples to customary tenure persist after the assumption of sovereignty. Indigenous peoples may also have certain rights on Crown land in many jurisdictions.

Australia

Indigenous land rights have historically been undermined by a variety of doctrines such as terra nullius. which is a Latin term meaning "land belonging to no one" In 1971, a group of Meriam people in Australia issued a legal claim for their ownership of their island of Mer in the Torres Strait. In their legal claim they issued that their land is inherently and exclusively owned, lived and governed by Meriam people, where they historically managed its political and social issues. After years of the case being heard by the legal courts, and after the death of one of the plaintiffs (Eddie Mabo), the High Court's judgement issued a recognision of the native's ownership to land and the denial of the myth of the terra nullius.

Canada

The leading case for Aboriginal title in Canada is Delgamuukw v. British Columbia (1997).
Another important case for Aboriginal title is the Tsilhqot'in Nation v. British Columbia (2014).

Japan 
Ever since the Ainu were recognised as the indigenous people of Japan in 2019, the Ainu have been able to apply for special land rights if requested. The Ainu Promotion Act 2019 specifically lists special rights over "national parks, rivers and trademarks to preserve Ainu culture".

Latin America 
As the political systems of some Latin American countries are now becoming more democratic and open to listening and embracing the views of minorities these issues of land rights have clearly come up to the surface of the political life. Despite this new "re-recognition" bit by bit, the indigenous groups are still among the poorest populations of the countries and they often have less access to resources and they have lesser opportunities for progress and development.
The legal situation of Indigenous land rights in the countries of Latin America is highly varied. There is still a very broad variation of Indigenous rights, laws and recognition throughout the whole continent. In the year 1957, the International Labour Organization(ILO), made the ILO Convention 107. This convention created laws and norms for the protection and integration of Indigenous peoples in independent countries. All the independent countries of Latin America and the Caribbean of that time ratified this convention. Since the 1960s they started with the recognition of the first Indigenous land claims since the colonial era. In the year 1989 the ILO made the Convention 169; the convention concerning Indigenous and Tribal Peoples in Independent Countries, which updates the ILO 107 of 1957. In this convention was also the recognition of the very close and important relationship between land and identity, or cultural identity very important. Today, this convention has been ratified by 15 Latin American and Caribbean countries. Even in countries where it has been ratified, limited implementation has led to conflicts over indigenous land rights such as the Escobal mine protests in Guatemala.

New Zealand

Indigenous land rights were recognized in the Treaty of Waitangi made between the British Crown and various Māori chiefs. The Treaty itself has often been ignored, but New Zealand courts have usually accepted the existence of native title. Controversies over Indigenous land rights have tended to revolve around the means by which Māori lost ownership, rather than whether they had ownership in the first place.

United States

The foundational decision for Aboriginal title in the United States is Johnson v. McIntosh (1823), authored by Chief Justice John Marshall.

Native Americans in the United States have largely been relegated to Indian reservations managed by tribes under the United States Department of the Interior's Bureau of Indian Affairs.

Civil law

Brazil
Indigenous land rights in Brazil is and has been an ongoing struggle for indigenous Brazilians, they have been treated as a minority group with no rights and are discriminated against. Discrimination against indigenous people has been present since colonization. In 1910 the Indian Protection Service was created due to the large amounts of violence inflicted on indigenous people, however this policy was ineffective and corrupt and was replaced by the National Indian Foundation in 1967. This policy worked to integrate indigenous people and effectively took their land so the government could prosper from its resources. In 1983 more demarcation laws were put in place, these laws prevented white settlers from stealing indigenous lands and further specified the borders of indigenous lands. However other state agencies were allowed to specify borders which was heavily influenced by the mining industry sectors. Only 14% of lands ended up being demarcated and lots of land was lost to mining companies.

In 1988 Brazil adopted a new constitution, it said that Indigenous lands and culture would be protected. This bill allowed indigenous people to safely live in their territory without fear of their land or resources being taken. However this bill ended up being far less successful than it originally promised, the Brazilian government was supposed to demarcate all indigenous territories by 1993 but over those five years they only demarcated 50% of the territories.

By 2017 still little action had been taken on securing the land rights of indigenous people in brazil. Brazil's president in 2017 declared a cutoff date on indigenous land. The bill stated that if the indigenous people were not in their territory before the 1988 cutoff, it was not their land to demarcate. 27 indigenous territories demarcation was suspended because of this cut off, even though the reason they couldn’t declare their territory before 1988 was due to the government or because they couldn’t prove they previously resided there. In February of 2020 president Jair Bolsonaro proposed bill 191/2020, which will allow Indigenous territories to be opened up to mining and hydroelectric generation. This bill has caused push back from indigenous communities, it threatens the health of their land and the safety of their people.

Mexico
The years after the Mexican Revolution of 1910 saw agrarian reforms (1917–1934), and in article 27 of the Mexican Constitution the encomienda system was abolished, and the right to communal land for traditional communities was affirmed. Thus the ejido-system was created, which in practice should comprise the power of private investments by foreign corporations and absentee landlords, and entitled the indigenous population to a piece of land to work and live on.
Since the 1980s and 1990s the focus of Mexico's economic policy concentrated more on industrial development and attracting foreign capital. The Salinas government initiated a process of privatization of land (through the PROCEDE-program). In 1992, as a (pre)condition for Mexico for entering the North American Free Trade Agreement (NAFTA) with the US and Canada, art.4 and art.27 of the Constitution were modified, by means of which it became possible to privatize communal ejido-land. This undermined the basic security of Indigenous communities to land entitlement, and former ejidatorios now became formally illegal land-squatters, and their communities informal settlements. (see also the Chiapas conflict)

Customary law

See also
 Free, prior and informed consent
 United Nations Declaration on the Rights of Peasants

References

Bibliography
Richardson, Benjamin J., Shin Imai & Kent McNeil. 2009. Indigenous peoples and the law: comparative and critical perspectives.
Robertson, L.G., (2005), Conquest by Law: How the Discovery of America Dispossessed Indigenous Peoples of Their Lands, Oxford University Press, New York 
Snow, Alpheus Henry. 1919. The Question of Aborigines in the Law and Practice of Nations.

External links
 Rainforest Foundation US fighting to secure land rights for indigenous communities in Latin America
 United Nations Declaration on the Rights of Indigenous Peoples as Adopted by the General Assembly, 13 September 2007
 Native Land Digital (interactive map)

 

es:Territorios indígenas